Erez Malul is an Israeli politician currently serving as a member of the Knesset for Shas.

Biography 
Malul studied in two Yeshivas in Jerusalem, and acquired a master's degree in law. He subsequently worked as an advisor to Minister of Religious Services David Azulai, before becoming the ministerial director's chief of staff. In 2017, Malul was questioned by police as part of an investigation of Aryeh Deri.

Ahead of the 2021 Israeli legislative election, Malul was given the thirteenth spot on Shas' party list, but was not elected. Ahead of the 2022 election, he was given the list's fourteenth spot, and was not elected as the party won eleven seats. However, he entered the Knesset on 2 February 2023 under the Norwegian Law.

Personal life 
Malul is married and has six children.

References

External links 

 

Members of the 25th Knesset (2022–)
Living people
Shas politicians
Year of birth missing (living people)